Kuanyshbek Yessekeev (Qýanyshbek Baqytbekuly Esekeev) is Chairman of the Board of Kazakhtelecom.

From January 25, 2019 to March 24, 2022, he was a member of the Board of Directors of Kcell JSC.

Early life 
In 1995, he graduated from Al-Farabi Kazakh National University, majoring in applied mathematics. During his student years, he already wrote a dissertation paper. At the age of 22 after graduation he attained the status of candidate of sciences in physics and mathematics. His topic of dissertation was "Dynamic problems solvability of impure liquids." After this he became youngest scientist in the Republic of Kazakhstan, the record is still unbeaten. Additionally, he received second bachelor's degree in finance and credit in Narxoz University.

He can speak Kazakh, Russian and English.

Career

Between 1998 and 2002, he was head of the IT department in Kazakhoil, Kazakhstan Temir Zholy.  In 2002, he worked in government affairs as Director of Department at Ministry of Finance, Economics and Budget Planning in the Republic of Kazakhstan and advised on informatization.  On 13 May 2004, Kuanyshbek Yessekeev was appointed as Deputy of Chairman in Kazakhstan Agency of Information and Communication. Starting from February 2007 until March 2010 lead KAIC as Chairman. In November 2008 entered the board of directors for National Info-Communication holding company Zerde.  In AIC he built Online Government of Republic of Kazakhstan, freed range of 3G networks for mobile operators. Starting on 15 March 2010, he worked as Chairman of Kazakhtelecom. Where he introduced network standards for 4G (through subsidiary company Altel), developed cloud services, digital television, and IP telecommunications, also prepared company before listing in London Stock Exchange. Position of Yesekeev's term as Chairman in Kazakhtelecom was extended for three years from 15 March 2016 - according to the decision of Board of Directors of Kazakhtelecom (Protocol from 05.02.2016 #1).

On January 25, 2019, Esekeyev Kuanyshbek Bakhytbekovich joined the new board of directors of Kcell JSC.

On March 16, 2022, by the decision of the Board of Directors of Kazakhtelecom JSC, Kuanyshbek Yesekeyev was elected to the position of Chairman of the Board.

May 24, 2022 - Kuanyshbek Yessekeyev was prematurely removed from the Board of Directors of Kcell JSC.

May 24, 2022 - headed the Supervisory Board of Mobile Telecom-Service.

On December 2 , 2022 , he was elected President of the Judo Federation of Kazakhstan.

References

21st-century Kazakhstani people
Living people
Kazakhstani politicians
Narxoz University alumni
1975 births